The Ambassador from Israel to Argentina is Israel's foremost diplomatic representative in Argentina.

Ambassadors of Israel to Argentina
Jacob Tsur 1949–1953
Arieh Leon Kubhovy 1953–1958
Arieh Levavi 1958–1960
Yosef Avidar 1960–1965
Moshe Alon 1965–1969
Eliezer Doron 1969–1974
Ram Nirgad 1974–1979
Dov Schmorak 1980–1985
Ephraim Tari 1985–1989
Itzhak Shefi 1989–1993
Itzhak Aviran 1993–2000
Benjamin Oron 2000–2004
Rafael Eldad 2004–2009
Daniel Gazit 2009–2011
Dorit Shavit 2011–2016
Ilan Sztulman 2016 - 2019
Galit Ronen from August 2019,

References 

Argentina
Israel